{{DISPLAYTITLE:C18H21NO5}}
The molecular formula C18H21NO5 (molar mass: 331.363 g/mol, exact mass: 331.1420 u) may refer to:

 Amikhelline
 Protokylol

Molecular formulas